Wyoming Highway 354 (WYO 354) is a  east-west Wyoming state road located in north-central Sublette County.

Route description
Wyoming Highway 354 begins its western end at Sublette CR 112 (Daniel-Merna Road) northwest of Daniel. Highway 354 turns southeasterly and follows the southern bank of the Green River. WYO 354 passes by the former site of Fort Bonneville, a fortified winter camp and fur trading post established in 1832, however no structure remains at the site today. Nearing 5 miles, WYO 354 crosses the Green River. At 6.17 miles reaches its end at US 189/US 191 just west of their junction at Daniel Junction, north of Daniel.

Major intersections

References

External links

 Wyoming State Routes 300-399
 WYO 354 - US 189/US 191 to Sublette CR 112

Transportation in Sublette County, Wyoming
354